Frank Roger Seaver (April 12, 1883–30 October 1964) was an American lawyer, Naval officer, oil executive, and philanthropist.

He grew up in Claremont, California, graduating from Pomona College in 1905, where he managed the football team and served as the first president of the Associated Students of Pomona College. He then attended Harvard Law School and practiced law in Los Angeles, and helped draft the first charter of Los Angeles County. He served in the Navy during World War I and helped establish the California Naval Militia.

He met Edward L. Doheny on a weekend yachting trip in 1919, who hired him to work for his oil enterprise. He became General Counsel and Managing General Agent for Doheny's operations in Mexico from 1921 to 1927, and convinced the Mexican government to hire him for an ambitious road paving project.

He later founded the Hydril Company, a producer of oil drilling equipment. He and his wife, Blanche, were a major contributor to Pomona, where they served as trustees, and where the Seaver Science Center is named after him and several other buildings are named after his family. They were also the principal benefactors of the Malibu campus of Pepperdine University, which named its College of Letters, Arts, and Sciences after him, and donated portions of their $10.1 million estate (equivalent to $ in ) to other institutions.

References

American philanthropists
Pomona College alumni
American lawyers
Pomona College trustees
American businesspeople in the oil industry
United States Navy officers
Harvard Law School alumni